Barberton is a census-designated place (CDP) in Clark County, Washington, United States. The population was 5,661 at the 2010 census, up from 4,617 at the 2000 census.

Based on per capita income, one of the more reliable measures of affluence, Barberton ranks 90th of 522 areas in the state of Washington to be ranked.

Geography
Barberton is located in southwestern Clark County at  (45.708502, -122.623036), part of a cluster of unincorporated communities north of Vancouver. It is bordered by Mount Vista to the north and northwest, Brush Prairie to the east, Five Corners to the southeast, Walnut Grove to the south, and Salmon Creek to the southwest. Interstate 205 forms the southwest edge of the Barberton CDP, separating it from Salmon Creek and Walnut Grove. The closest access points to I-205 are Exit 32 in Walnut Grove to the south and Exit 36 in Mount Vista to the northwest.

Demographics
As of the census of 2010, there were 5,661 people and 2,086 households in the CDP. The population density, as of the census of 2000 was 1,071.9 people per square mile (413.6/km2). There were 1,658 housing units at an average density of 384.9/sq mi (148.5/km2). The racial makeup of the CDP was 93.72% White, 0.71% African American, 0.65% Native American, 2.19% Asian, 0.15% Pacific Islander, 0.50% from other races, and 2.08% from two or more races. Hispanic or Latino of any race were 2.43% of the population. 23.9% were of German, 12.6% English, 11.2% Irish, 8.0% American and 5.8% Norwegian ancestry according to Census 2000.

There were 1,597 households, out of which 40.6% had children under the age of 18 living with them, 72.6% were married couples living together, 6.6% had a female householder with no husband present, and 17.1% were non-families. 13.0% of all households were made up of individuals, and 4.8% had someone living alone who was 65 years of age or older. The average household size was 2.89 and the average family size was 3.16.

In the CDP, the age distribution of the population shows 28.5% under the age of 18, 6.4% from 18 to 24, 27.7% from 25 to 44, 28.9% from 45 to 64, and 8.6% who were 65 years of age or older. The median age was 38 years. For every 100 females, there were 100.2 males. For every 100 females age 18 and over, there were 99.5 males.

The median income for a household in the CDP was $64,779, and the median income for a family was $67,054. Males had a median income of $51,396 versus $30,085 for females. The per capita income for the CDP was $25,066. About 1.6% of families and 2.5% of the population were below the poverty line, including 3.0% of those under age 18 and 9.0% of those age 65 or over.

References

Census-designated places in Clark County, Washington
Census-designated places in Washington (state)